Chalcosyrphus (Xylotomima) ontario (Curran, 1941), the Bare-winged Leafwalker, is a rare species of syrphid fly found in Southeastern and Western Canada and in California. Hoverflies can remain nearly motionless in flight. The adult of the species are also known as flower flies, as they are commonly found around and on flowers, from which they get both energy-giving nectar and protein-rich pollen.

Distribution
Canada, United States.

References

Eristalinae
Insects described in 1941
Diptera of North America
Hoverflies of North America
Taxa named by Charles Howard Curran